The IPWA Tag Team Championship was a professional wrestling tag team championship in the Independent Professional Wrestling Alliance (IPWA). The inaugural champions were Death & Destruction (Frank Parker and Roger Anderson), who defeated the American Patriot and Kevin Dillon in Manassas, Virginia on October 10, 1995 to become the first IPWA Tag Team Champions.

There were six officially recognized champions with Death & Destruction winning the championship a record three-times. They also held the record for longest-reigning champions at 292 days. Several notable tag teams wrestled for the championship during its near six-year history with former champions including Darkside (Glen Osbourne and Rockin' Rebel), The Headbangers (Mosh and Thrasher), and Steve Corino and Adam Flash.

Title history

Names

Reigns

List of combined reigns

Footnotes

References

External links
Official website

Tag team wrestling championships